RNLB Benjamin Bond Cabbell II (ON 12) was a Cromer non self-righter type lifeboat stationed at Cromer Lifeboat Station in the English county of Norfolk from September 1884 until September 1902.

Design and construction
The Benjamin Bond Cabbell II was the fifth lifeboat to be stationed at the Norfolk town of Cromer, and the second lifeboat to bear the name Benjamin Bond Cabbell. At the design process for this lifeboat, a number of meetings were held by the RNLI’s chief inspector of Lifeboats, Captain the Hon H.W. Chetwynd and the service's surveyor Mr Prowse with the crew of the Cromer Lifeboat. At the meetings the lifeboat men were asked what their preferences were, when considering designs for the new lifeboat. The local men who were mainly fishermen expressed a desire for a new boat to be on the lines of the lifeboat which had been stationed there before 1858. These suggestions by local men, Mr James Davis, Mr James Mayes and Mr Thomas Blogg were very similar to the Norfolk and Suffolk Type lifeboats. By 27 November 1883 the surveyor, Mr Prowse, had agreed a design with the local fisherman, and an order was placed with James Beeching boat builders, of Great Yarmouth.

Construction
The new lifeboat hull was constructed using the clench method fixed with copper fastenings. There were fourteen oars which were double banked and she was also equipped with a dipping lug sail. The lifeboat would be steered by either a rudder or sweep oars. Benjamin Bond Cabbell II had a watertight deck, with copper tubes and self-acting valves to release the water, and portable airtight cases round the sides of the boat between the deck and the thwarts. Cork-packed air-cases were placed under the deck in the wings of the lifeboat. These cases weighed 4.5 tons and drew  of water clear of ballast. The boat had a relatively light construction with a high bow and a raking stem. The keel was curved, typical of the north country-designed lifeboats first built in the late eighteenth century. The water ballast tanks had ten relieving valves and the rudder was retractable to prevent it being damaged when beach launched or during the recovery procedure.

Service
The Benjamin Bond Cabbell II was formally named and christened on 29 September 1884 by Mrs Bond Cabbell when she broke a bottle of claret over the boat, followed by a launch from the lifeboats carriage, whilst the band played Rule Britannia and the church bells rang. The Benjamin Bond Cabbell II was launched to only thirteen times during her service at Cromer, saving twenty six lives in the process. Her first service took place on 28 January 1888. Benjamin Bond Cabbell II was launched at 11:15 am to the brigantine Jane Marie of London which was bound from Hartlepool for Greenwich with a cargo of coal. The crew of seven were taken on board the Benjamin Bond Cabbell II and landed at Cromer.

A Hero’s early years
On 28 December 1894 an eighteen-year-old boy joined the crew of the Benjamin Bond Cabbell II for the first time. His name was Henry George Blogg and he would go on to be referred to as "the greatest of the lifeboatmen". Henry Blogg GC BEM (6 February 1876 – 13 June 1954) took part in his first service to the schooner Fair City of Gloucester. She had lost her mast and rigging in severe weather. The lifeboat stayed with her through the night escorting her part way to shore before her crew were taken off by the Sea Palling Lifeboat Hearts of Oak ON351. The schooner then broke into pieces and sank

Last service
Her final service was to the steamship Celerity of Great Yarmouth on 17 February 1901. The Celerity was bound from Rochester to Leith carrying a cargo of cement when she began shipping water and her fires had to be extinguished. After standing by her all night the lifeboat then escorted the vessel to Great Yarmouth. The Benjamin Bond Cabbell II was withdrawn from service after the RNLI deemed she was unfit for further service.

Service and rescues

References

1884 ships
Cromer lifeboats
Cromer-class lifeboats